Bockstael railway station is a railway station in Brussels, Belgium operated by the SNCB/NMBS. It opened in 1982 to replace the Laeken railway station. The station is located in the City of Brussels on the Belgian railway line 50, between the Brussels-North and Jette railway station. It is named after the nearby Place Bockstael/Bockstaelplein.

Train services
The station is served by the following service(s):

Brussels RER services (S3) Dendermonde - Brussels - Denderleeuw - Zottegem - Oudenaarde (weekdays)
Brussels RER services (S4) Aalst - Denderleeuw - Brussels-Luxembourg (- Etterbeek - Merode - Vilvoorde) (weekdays)
Brussels RER services (S10) Dendermonde - Brussels - Denderleeuw - Aalst

Connections
The station offers a connection with the Bockstael metro station as well as tram route 62 and 93 and bus routes 49, 53, 88 and 89. Many De Lijn buses also stop at Bockstael.

References

Railway stations in Brussels
City of Brussels
Railway stations opened in 1982